József Györe (16 November 1902 – 28 March 1985) was a Hungarian communist politician, who served as Interior Minister between 1952 and 1953.

References
 Rulers.org

1902 births
1985 deaths
Politicians from Budapest
People from the Kingdom of Hungary
Social Democratic Party of Hungary politicians
Hungarian Communist Party politicians
Members of the Hungarian Working People's Party
Members of the Hungarian Socialist Workers' Party
Hungarian Interior Ministers
Members of the National Assembly of Hungary (1953–1958)
Members of the National Assembly of Hungary (1958–1963)